Meloidogyne chitwoodi is a plant pathogenic root-knot nematode that is a crop pest of potatoes, carrots, and black salsify.  Root-knot nematodes such as M. chitwoodi cause the production of root-knot galls when their larvae infect the plant's roots and capture nutrients stored in the roots.

References

External links 
 Nemaplex, University of California - Meloidogyne chitwoodi

Tylenchida
Potato diseases
Vegetable diseases
Agricultural pest nematodes